Lieutenant Colonel Abdoulaye Maïga (born 12 May 1981) is a Malian military officer, he was appointed interim prime minister of Mali on 21 August 2022.

Maïga is a lieutenant colonel in the Malian National Gendarmerie[Fr], which is a military force with law enforcement duties among the civilian population and is part of the Malian armed forces.  Maïga studied diplomacy and international law in Algiers. He studied defence and international security policies in Paris and "holds a doctorate in International Security and Defense from Jean Moulin Lyon 3 University of the 'ED 492' Doctoral School of Law."  He also studied human rights and humanitarian law at what is now Paris-Saclay University at Évry.  Maïga started a doctorate in business law.  He wrote a thesis on "the credibility of ECOWAS" to ensure peace and security.

Maïga has worked in the Early Warning Directorate on the Prevention of Terrorism in Economic Community of West African States (ECOWAS).  He worked as a police officer for MONUSCO (part of the United Nations mission to the Democratic Republic of the Congo).

Maïga was not part of the group of officers led by Colonel Assimi Goïta who took power in the August 2020 Malian coup d'état. But he is considered close to Colonel Goïta, and became "the voice of the policy of breaking with France and its allies" after the May 2021 Malian coup d'état. In June 2021 he was appointed Minister of Territorial Administration and Decentralisation, and on 1 December 2021 was also appointed spokesperson for the government.

References 

1981 births
Living people
Date of birth missing (living people)
Heads of state of Mali
Malian military personnel
Prime Ministers of Mali
Colonels (military rank)
21st-century Malian people
People from Bamako